This is a list of members of the South Australian House of Assembly from 1893 to 1896, as elected at the 1893 colonial election:

 East Torrens MHA Thomas Playford resigned on 17 April 1894. David Packham won the resulting by-election on 19 May.
 North Adelaide MHA George Charles Hawker died on 21 May 1895. Paddy Glynn won the resulting by-election on 8 June.

References

External links
History of South Australian elections 1857–2006, volume 1: ECSA

Members of South Australian parliaments by term
19th-century Australian politicians